Millcreek Township is the name of some places in the U.S. state of Pennsylvania:

Millcreek Township, Clarion County, Pennsylvania
Millcreek Township, Erie County, Pennsylvania
Millcreek Township, Lebanon County, Pennsylvania

See also
Mill Creek Township, Pennsylvania (disambiguation)

Pennsylvania township disambiguation pages